The 1956 Cincinnati Redlegs season consisted of the Redlegs finishing in third place in the National League with a record of 91–63, two games behind the NL Champion Brooklyn Dodgers. The Redlegs were managed by Birdie Tebbetts and played their home games at Crosley Field, where they drew 1,125,928 fans, third-most in their league.

Offseason 
 November 28, 1955: Hobie Landrith was traded by the Redlegs to the Chicago Cubs for Hal Jeffcoat.
 January 31, 1956: Jackie Collum was traded by the Redlegs to the St. Louis Cardinals for Brooks Lawrence and Sonny Senerchia.
 Prior to 1956 season: Joe Azcue was signed as an amateur free agent by the Redlegs.

Regular season 

The Redlegs were in first place at mid-season and stayed in the pennant race until the last day of the season, ending up with a 91–63 record, two games behind the Brooklyn Dodgers. For his efforts, the Baseball Writers' Association of America voted Birdie Tebbetts as the 1956 Manager of the Year.

The 1956 Redlegs tied the National League and MLB record for home runs in a season, hitting 221 over 155 regular-season games.  (The 1947 Giants also slugged 221 in 155 games played.)  Three Redlegs hit more than 35 homers, with Frank Robinson (38) establishing a record for rookies; Wally Post (36) and Ted Kluszewski (35) were the others. Gus Bell (29) and Ed Bailey (28) came within reach of the 30-home-run mark, Bailey in only 383 at bats. The mark stood until , when the New York Yankees hit 240 homers in the first year of the modern 162-game schedule.

On Sunday, June 24, following a doubleheader sweep of the Brooklyn Dodgers, eleven Redlegs players appeared on the panel quiz show What's My Line?.

Season standings

Record vs. opponents

Notable transactions 
 April 1, 1956: Jim Pearce was assigned by the Redlegs to the St. Louis Cardinals.

Roster

Player stats

Batting

Starters by position 
Note: Pos = Position; G = Games played; AB = At bats; H = Hits; Avg. = Batting average; HR = Home runs; RBI = Runs batted in

Other batters 
Note: G = Games played; AB = At bats; H = Hits; Avg. = Batting average; HR = Home runs; RBI = Runs batted in

Pitching

Starting pitchers 
Note: G = Games pitched; IP = Innings pitched; W = Wins; L = Losses; ERA = Earned run average; SO = Strikeouts

Other pitchers 
Note: G = Games pitched; IP = Innings pitched; W = Wins; L = Losses; ERA = Earned run average; SO = Strikeouts

Relief pitchers 
Note: G = Games pitched; W = Wins; L = Losses; SV = Saves; ERA = Earned run average; SO = Strikeouts

Farm system 

LEAGUE CHAMPIONS: Douglas

References

External links
1956 Cincinnati Redlegs season at Baseball Reference

Cincinnati Reds seasons
Cincinnati Redlegs season
Cincinnati Reds